A. H. Salahuddin Mahmud is a Jatiya Party (Ershad) politician and the former Member of Parliament of Cox's Bazar-1.

Career
Mahmud was elected to parliament from Cox's Bazar-1 as a Jatiya Party candidate in 1986 and 1988.

References

Jatiya Party politicians
Living people
3rd Jatiya Sangsad members
4th Jatiya Sangsad members
Year of birth missing (living people)